Păuliș is a commune in Arad County, Romania, situated in the contact zone of the Mureș Couloir with the Arad Plateau and Zărand Mountains. The administrative territory of the commune is 12,806 hectares. The commune centre  is situated at 25 km from Arad. It is composed of four villages: Barațca (Pálosbaracka), Cladova (Kalodva), Păuliș and Sâmbăteni (Szabadhely).

Population
According to the last census, the population of the commune counts 4120 inhabitants, out of which 88.4% are Romanians, 2.5%  Hungarians, 4.4% Roms, 0.5% Germans and 4.1% are of other or undeclared nationalities.

History
The first documentary record of Păuliș dates back to 1333. Barațca was attested documentarily in 1913, Cladova in 1308, while Sâmbăteni in 1138.

Economy
The commune's present-day economy can be characterized by a powerful dynamic force with significant developments in all the
sectors present in the commune. In agriculture vine-growing occupies a significant proportion, Barațca village being a well-known viticultural and wine-growing centre. The industry of building materials is represented by the exploitation of granite and diorite in Cladova and Barațca.

Tourism
Among the main sights are the Heroes' Monument in Păuliș put up to the memory of the Romanian soldiers killed in the battles in 1944 while defending the Mureș couloir, the dendrologic park with rare species of yew-tree, magnolia and Himalayan pine, the reinforced settlement and the church dating from the 14-16th centuries situated on the Carierei Hill in Cladova, as well as the famous blindages in Sâmbăteni dating back to the Dacian-Roman period.

The valleys around Cladova were particularly beautiful, comprising extensive oak forest, but nowadays much of this has been destroyed by local inhabitants carrying out illegal treecutting, and unlicensed companies removing up to 500 tons of logs each day. The machinery used to do this, such as large trucks and tractors, has destroyed most of the original rural roads.

See also
 Battle of Păuliș

References

Communes in Arad County
Localities in Crișana